Les Morrison (25 January 1895 – 12 August 1966) was an  Australian rules footballer who played with St Kilda in the Victorian Football League (VFL).

Notes

External links 

1895 births
1966 deaths
Australian rules footballers from Victoria (Australia)
St Kilda Football Club players
Prahran Football Club players